Giovanni Gaetano Luporini (1865–1948) was an Italian composer.  A native of Lucca, he studied there with  before transferring to the Milan Conservatory, where he studied with Anselmi and Alfredo Catalani.   He served as director of Lucca's Pacini Institute between 1902 and 1937.  As a composer, he was active in the field of sacred music, and served as maestro di cappella of the Lucca Cathedral.

Luporini also composed orchestral and vocal music.  He wrote a number of operas, including:

Marcella (Milan, 1891)
I dispetti amorosi (Turin, 1894) – libretto by Luigi Illica
La collana di Pasqua (Naples, 1896) later presented as Nora 
Marie Lacroix (Lucca, 1908)
He also composed an operetta, L'aquila e le colombe.

A Mass for mixed chorus and orchestra, and an Andante religioso, have been recorded on the Bongiovanni label, coupled with a Mass and Andante by Lamberto Landi.

His grandson Gaetano Giani Luporini was also a classical composer.

References

External links
 

1865 births
1948 deaths
Italian classical composers
19th-century classical composers
20th-century classical composers
Musicians from Lucca
Italian opera composers
Male opera composers
Milan Conservatory alumni
Italian male classical composers
20th-century Italian composers
19th-century Italian composers
20th-century Italian male musicians
19th-century Italian male musicians